Samuele Perisan (born 21 August 1997) is an Italian professional footballer, who plays as a goalkeeper for Empoli.

Club career 
Born in San Vito al Tagliamento, a town belonging to the province of Pordenone, Perisan joined the youth sector of fellow Friulian club Udinese and came through its youth ranks in 2016, when he became the club's third-choice goalkeeper behind Orestis Karnezis and Simone Scuffet.

One year later, Perisan obtained his first opportunity as a professional player, thanks to a loan at Triestina until the end of the year: he later made his Serie C debut on 10 September 2017, in a game against Ravenna. In January 2018, he stayed in the third tier as Udinese decided to arrange a new loan, this time at Arezzo, where the keeper managed to gain more playing time.

In the following summer, he was sent on loan once more, joining Padova for one season. However, on 16 January 2019, his spell was terminated early by mutual consent and he returned to Udinese, where he went on serving as a third-choice goalkeeper again (this time behind Juan Musso and Nícolas) for the rest of the 2018-19 season, as well as the 2019-20 season, although he never registered a single appearance for the Friulian team.

On 5 October 2020, he agreed a permanent move to Pordenone and signed a three-year contract. Although the team went through a fluctuating season, as they finished in fifteenth place in Serie B, Perisan broke out as one of the league's most consistent goalkeepers, having collected 13 clean sheets in 35 appearances and even being deemed as Player of the Month in January 2021. His performances gained him a one-year extension of his contract with Pordenone at the end of the season.

On 23 June 2022, Perisan signed a three-year contract with Serie A club Empoli.

International career
Perisan represented Italy at youth level, featuring in their under-18 and under-20 sides.

In May 2017, he was included in the Italian under-20 squad that would take part in the 2017 FIFA U-20 World Cup, being the third-choice goalkeeper behind Andrea Zaccagno and Alessandro Plizzari. The Azzurri eventually finished third in the competition.

References

External links
 

1997 births
People from San Vito al Tagliamento
Living people
Italian footballers
Association football goalkeepers
Italy youth international footballers
Udinese Calcio players
U.S. Triestina Calcio 1918 players
S.S. Arezzo players
Calcio Padova players
Pordenone Calcio players
Empoli F.C. players
Serie B players
Serie C players
Footballers from Friuli Venezia Giulia